Ambohitralanana is a town and commune in northern Madagascar. It belongs to the district of Antalaha, which is a part of Sava Region. In 2001, the population was 17,850.

Ambohitralanana has a riverine harbour and schools for primary and junior high education.

As of 2001, the majority of townspeople (80%) are farmers, but only 0.6% raise livestock. The most important crops are rice and vanilla, followed by cloves and cassava. Industry and service sectors employ 1% and 0.4% of the population, respectively, while fishing employs 18%.

References and notes 

Populated places in Sava Region